The  College World Series was the sixth NCAA-sanctioned baseball tournament that determined a national champion.  The tournament was held as the conclusion of the 1952 NCAA baseball season and was played at Johnny Rosenblatt Stadium in Omaha, Nebraska from June 12 to June 17.  The tournament's champion was the Holy Cross Crusaders, coached by Jack Barry.  The Most Outstanding Player was James O'Neill of Holy Cross.
 
The tournament consisted of no preliminary round of play as teams were selected directly into the College World Series.  From 1954 to the present, teams compete in the NCAA Division I baseball tournament preliminary round(s), to determine the eight teams that will play in the College World Series.

Participants

Brackets

Game results

Notes

References

College World Series
College World Series
College World Series
College World Series
Baseball competitions in Omaha, Nebraska
College sports tournaments in Nebraska